Jieshi may refer to:

 Jieshi, Guangdong (碣石镇), town in Lufeng, Guangdong, China
 Jieshi, Shandong (界石镇), China
 Chiang Kai-shek (1887–1975), or Jiang Jieshi (蔣介石), Chinese political and military leader